Shiloh is a ghost town located in Issaquena County, Mississippi, United States.  Shiloh Landing was its port on the Mississippi River.

Shiloh began as a plantation owned by Richard Christmas, who in 1860 held 160 enslaved laborers there. A post office operated under the name Shiloh Landing from 1892 to 1901 and under the name Shiloh from 1901 to 1932.

In 1900, Shiloh had a post office and a population of 78.

Nothing remains of Shiloh, which today is uninhabited and covered by forest to river's edge.

References

Former populated places in Issaquena County, Mississippi
Mississippi populated places on the Mississippi River
Former populated places in Mississippi